Campalagian is an Austronesian language spoken in West Sulawesi, Indonesia. It is closely related to Bugis.

References

Languages of Sulawesi
South Sulawesi languages